Hilltops Council is a local government area in the South West Slopes region of New South Wales, Australia. This area was formed on 12 May 2016 from the merger of Boorowa Council, Harden Shire and Young Shire. The local government area covers much the same area as the Hilltops wine region.

The Mayor of Hilltops Council is Margaret Roles, an independent politician, who was elected unopposed after the inaugural election held on 4 December 2021.

Main towns and villages
The largest town in Hilltops Council is Young. The other major urban centres are Boorowa, Murrumburrah and Harden. Other towns and localities in the Council include Bendick Murrell, Berremangra, Bribbaree, Frogmore, Galong, Godfreys Creek, Hovells Creek, Jugiong, Kingsvale, Koorawatha, Maimuru, Milvale, Monteagle, Mount Collins, Murringo, Reids Flat, Rugby, Rye Park, Taylors Flat, Thuddungra, Wirrimah, Wombat and Wyangala (part).

Demographics

Council

Current composition and election method
Hilltops Council is composed of eleven Councillors elected proportionally as a single ward. All Councillors are elected for a fixed four-year term of office. The Mayor is elected by the Councillors at the first meeting of the council.

The current Council, elected on 4 December 2021, is:

See also

 Local government areas of New South Wales

References

External links

 
Local government areas of New South Wales
2016 establishments in Australia
Hume Highway